Candice Gilg (born 27 July 1972) is a French freestyle skier. She was born in Dakar, Senegal. She competed in the 1992 Winter Olympics in Albertville, and at the 1994 Winter Olympics in Lillehammer, where she placed fifth in women's moguls. 

Her brother Youri Gilg is also a freestyle skier.

References

External links 
 

1972 births
Sportspeople from Dakar
Living people
French female freestyle skiers
Olympic freestyle skiers of France
Freestyle skiers at the 1992 Winter Olympics
Freestyle skiers at the 1994 Winter Olympics
Freestyle skiers at the 1998 Winter Olympics